Events from the year 1860 in Sweden

Incumbents
 Monarch – Charles XV

Events
 A.E. Schwabitz and A.E. Rudberg produces a proposal for the regulation of Gamla stan.
 The Dissenter Acts (Sweden) allow citizens to leave the state church. 
 Kamewa is created. 
 Royal Gothenburg Yacht Club is founded. 
 The internal passport, until then needed to travel inside the country, is abolished.
 Jeanette Berglind founds the pioneer institution Tysta Skolan (Silent School) for the deaf in Stockholm.

Births

 21 January – Karl Staaff, prime minister  (died 1915) 
 7 February – Anna Norrie, actress (died 1957) 
 18 February – Anders Zorn, painter  (died 1920)
 28 May – Sigrid Elmblad, writer and translator (died 1926)

 31 July - Ellen Hartman, actress (died 1945)
 Elin Engström, politician (Social Democrat), trade unionist and women's right activist (died 1956)
 17 December - Carl Lindhagen, politician  (died 1926)

Deaths
 11 May – Israel Hwasser, physician and writer, member of the Swedish Academy (born 1790)
 10 August – Sara Augusta Malmborg, singer, pianist and painter (born 1810)
 17 December – Désirée Clary, queen dowager  (born 1777)
 - Kloka Anna, cunning woman  (born 1797)
 - Ebba d'Aubert, pianist  (born 1819)

References

External links

 
Years of the 19th century in Sweden
Sweden